Colorado Mountain College (CMC) is a public community college with multiple campuses in western Colorado. Founded in 1965, the institution offers numerous associate degrees, seven bachelor's degrees and a variety of career-technical certificates. Approximately 20,000 students take on-campus or online classes every year.

The CMC district includes six counties in the heart of the Colorado Rocky Mountains: Eagle, Grand, Jackson, Lake, Garfield, Pitkin, Summit, and Routt. The state-designated service area includes: Grand, Jackson, and Chaffee.

Besides eight community campuses, three full-service residential campuses in Leadville, Steamboat Springs, and Spring Valley at Glenwood Springs, provide students with residence halls, cafeterias, recreation facilities, and libraries. Students also have the opportunity to participate in different recreational and educational activities through student clubs, honor societies, a theatre company, and sports teams.

History 

On November 2, 1965, voters of five Colorado counties approved the formation of a college district including the Eagle, Garfield, Routt, Lake, Summit and Pitkin counties. The junior college plan was unanimously approved by the State Board of Education and the name “Colorado Mountain College”, suggested by the governing committee member, Harold Koonce, was immediately adopted.

The residential campuses of Leadville and Spring Valley at Glenwood Springs were the first ones built, and the first classes started in the fall of 1967, with Dr. Joe Davenport as the first president of the institution, and an in-district tuition of $6.75 per credit hour. Davenport died shortly after the opening of the two campuses, crashing his single-engine plane while attempting to land in Glenwood Springs.

The first 22 programs offered were Astrogeophysical Technology, Automobile Mechanics, Building Trades, Civil Technology, Commercial Photography, Data Processing, Drafting-Design Technology, Electrical-Electronics Technology, Metals Technology, Industrial Management, Farm and Ranch Management, Food Service Technology, Home Economics, Landscape Technology, Mining Technology, Office Management, Photographic Technology, Recreation Supervision, Resort Management and Secretarial Science.

In 1972, Summit County offered its first courses, followed by expansions in Rifle, Salida and Buena Vista. In 1974, the college received full accreditation by the North Central Association of Schools and Colleges.

The Isaacson School for Communication, Arts & Media, opened in 2012 with classes at the Spring Valley campus. That same year, a three-story $18 million Academic Center was opened at CMC Steamboat Springs.

In November 2019, the Salida and Poncha Springs communities voted to join the Colorado Mountain College special taxing district, while simultaneously the existing CMC district also voted to have them join, creating the newest CMC location.

The federal government designated Colorado Mountain College as a Hispanic-Serving Institution (HSI) in 2021 after reaching enrollment of 25% or more Latino students.

Community campuses 
Colorado Mountain College has eight community campuses and three full-service residential campuses that provide residence halls, cafeterias, student recreation facilities, and libraries, and are available for summer conferences.

Aspen 

The Aspen community campus serves traditional and non-traditional students. Colorado Mountain College Aspen facilities include computer labs, “smart rooms”, science lab, fitness studio, gallery, and art studios. It is also home to Aspen-Santa Fe Ballet. CMC Aspen offers various degrees and certificate programs.

Breckenridge and Dillon 

The Breckenridge and Dillon campuses provide certificate, bachelor's and associate degree programs to students in Summit County. Colorado Mountain College Breckenridge offers traditional classroom settings, professional training opportunities and online courses. The Dillon Center also offers extensive options for college-level classes, English as a Second Language programs and technology-based learning labs.

Colorado Mountain College in Breckenridge and Dillon is home to CMC's Culinary Arts program, one of the few apprentice-based culinary programs in the country.

CMC's Summit County campuses also offer a Wilderness Emergency Medical Services certificate program, Outdoor Education, Nursing, and a variety of other programs, degrees, certifications, and non-credit classes.

Carbondale 

Located in downtown Carbondale, Colorado, the Lappala Center is named after its land donors, Paul and Ginny Lappala, and offers associate and bachelor-level classes for CMC degree programs or transfer. CMC Carbondale also offers dual credit courses for local high school students, non-credit workshops, continuing education opportunities, and fitness classes.

Glenwood Springs 
The Glenwood Springs campus offers associate and bachelor's level classes for CMC degree programs or for transfer. CMC Glenwood Springs also offers dual credit courses for local high school students, non-credit workshops, seminars, continuing education, and personal advancement opportunities.

Rifle 
Process technology, solar energy, and welding are offered on-campus in Rifle, where students gain hands-on experience with a non-functioning gas and oil pad, gas processing facility, and solar farm that generates 33% of campus power.

Salida 
In November 2019 voters overwhelmingly chose to annex Salida and Poncha Springs into CMC’s district, creating the newest CMC campus. Salida students can enroll in certificate, associate, and bachelor-level classes for CMC degree programs like EMT Basic, Certified Nurse Aide, Business Administration, Early Childhood Education, Elementary Education, and Nursing pre-requisites.

Vail Valley at Edwards 
The campus in Edwards provides certificates, associate and bachelor's degrees, ESL and GED classes. The college also prepares students to transfer to other four-year institutions. CMC's Edwards campus often hosts community events and educational opportunities.

Residential campuses

Leadville 

The Leadville residential campus was one of the first Colorado Mountain College campuses, built in 1967. CMC Leadville is the highest elevation college campus in the country, at 10,152 feet above sea level, with views of Colorado's two highest peaks, Mt. Massive and Mt. Elbert. The campus itself consists of six main buildings, all named after mines in the region: Mountain View Residence Hall, Climax Molybdenum Leadership Center, Pinnacle Resource Center, New Discovery Academic Center, Crown Point, and Coronado Café. The Mountain View Residence Hall has capacity for 128 students in 64 rooms.

Colorado Mountain College Leadville offers over 40 degrees and certificate options, including Ski Area Operations, Outdoor Recreation Leadership, and Ecosystem Science & Stewardship. CMC Leadville has a tradition to form top Ski Operations professionals, and alumni are often recognized for their accomplishments at local resorts as well as international events.

Spring Valley at Glenwood Springs 

One of CMC's original campuses built in 1967, Spring Valley has 124 rooms in the Sopris Residence Hall. Spring Valley offers bachelor's and associate degree classes for several programs in science labs, smart rooms and traditional classrooms.

The Spring Valley campus has a 220-acre veterinary facility with large and small animals, mountain biking trails, an 18-hole disc golf course and a soccer field park. Approximately 1500 students pursue education in photography, design, veterinary medicine, nursing, outdoor education and more. Spring Valley is also home for the Isaacson School for Communication, Arts and Media's facilities, with a prototype lab, radio, video and photo studios.

This is the main theater certificate campus, hosting theater and musical performances throughout the year at the New Space Theatre.

Steamboat Springs 

Colorado Mountain College Steamboat Springs provides flexible course schedules for a variety of associate and bachelor's degrees and certificate programs. Notable programs include ski & snowboard business, resort management, art, science, outdoor education, restaurant management and dozens more. With 110 residence hall rooms, a disc golf course and a ski/snowboard rail yard, the CMC Steamboat Springs residential campus offers access to recreation in every season.

The campus also hosts the SnowSports Industries America (SIA) certificate tests, for snowsports industry professionals.

The Colorado Mountain College Steamboat Ski Team  is an associate member of the Rocky Mountain Intercollegiate Ski Association (RMISA), the strongest college ski racing conference in the country.

Academics
Colorado Mountain College offers seven bachelor’s degrees, 53 associate degrees, and 72 certificates of one-year or less. The college also provides GED and ESL classes, continuing education, non-credit classes, and workshops to Colorado Mountain communities. Most of its academic programs meet the requirements of the Colorado State Guaranteed Transfer Courses. Colorado Mountain College is known for small class sizes, personalized attention, and hands-on experience.

Non-credit 
Students can choose from more than 300 different non-credit classes to continue their education at Colorado Mountain College's 11 locations. From French cuisine, local geology, personal financing, yoga, social media skills, or learn to crochet.

Concurrent enrollment 
High school students in CMC districts can earn college credits from Colorado Mountain College before graduating high school  through the Colorado Concurrent Enrollment Programs Act (CEPA). One can take dual college and high school credits in commonly required classes as English, math, speech, foreign language, computer science and psychology.

The College-Level Examination Program (CLEP) at Colorado Mountain College, also gives students of any age the opportunity to demonstrate college-level achievement through a program of exams in undergraduate college courses.

Tuition 
CMC offers three tuition rates based on residence status: In-District, In-State, and Out-of-State tuition. Other special tuition rates include a CMC Service Area Rate, and a Veterans & Military Families Discount Rate.

Isaacson School for Communication, Arts & Media 

The school was named after the author and journalist, Walter Isaacson, former president and CEO of the Aspen Institute, a nonpartisan educational and policy studies organization based in Washington, D.C., and Aspen, Colorado. Isaacson is also former chairman and CEO of Cable News Network (CNN) and former managing editor of Time magazine.

Notable graduates of the Isaacson School include Pat Davison, who was part of a team awarded the Pulitzer Prize in 2000.

Sopris Theatre 

The company usually performs three to five theatre productions each season, in its theatre that seats 100 people at the Colorado Mountain College Spring Valley at Glenwood Springs campus.

Sustainability 
Colorado Mountain College is one of the nine postsecondary institutions in the US, and the only in Colorado, to receive the 2017 U.S. Department of Education Green Ribbon for Schools Postsecondary Sustainability Award. In January 2019, the U.S. Green Building Council and Second Nature honored Colorado Mountain College as one of eight U.S. institutions to receive the 2018 Higher Education Climate Leadership Awards. CMC's award, an honorable mention, is for cross-sector collaboration, recognizing the college's students, faculty and administration for partnering with many other organizations to reduce greenhouse gas emissions, monitor changes in climate and support land preservation.

Some of the sustainability efforts applied to all its campuses are: recycling, conduct professional energy audits, replace incandescent light bulbs with compact fluorescent or LED bulbs, replaced conventional thermostats with programmable, use green cleaning products and paper products made from recycled fibers.

Notable alumni 
Chris Klug, three-time Olympic snowboarder who has eleven US national snowboarding titles; won a bronze medal at the 2002 Winter Olympics
Johnny Spillane, Olympic silver medalist in Nordic combined
Katie Uhlaender, four-time Olympic skeleton racer
Elizabeth Velasco, member-elect of the Colorado House of Representatives

References

External links
 Official website

Colorado Community College System
Education in Routt County, Colorado
Education in Lake County, Colorado
Education in Eagle County, Colorado
Education in Garfield County, Colorado
Educational institutions established in 1967
Public universities and colleges in Colorado